Carsten Siersbaek is a former Denmark association football player who played professionally in the United States and Denmark.

In 1994, Siersbaek joined the Washington Warthogs of the Continental Indoor Soccer League.  At the end of the season, he joined the Baltimore Bays for the end of the USISL season.  In 1995, Siersbaek moved up to the Colorado Foxes of the A-League.  He remained with the Foxes through the 1997 season.  On November 25, 1997, the Wichita Wings of the National Professional Soccer League signed Siersback.  In February 1998, Siersback scored a goal in a Colorado Rapids exhibition victory over Columbus Crew.  The Rapids released him during the pre-season.  Siersbaek then returned to Denmark and played for Aarhus Fremad during the 1998-1999 season.

External links
 Statistik: CARSTEN SIERSBÆK

References

Living people
1974 births
A-League (1995–2004) players
Baltimore Bays (1993–1998) players
Colorado Foxes players
Continental Indoor Soccer League players
Danish men's footballers
Danish expatriate men's footballers
National Professional Soccer League (1984–2001) players
USISL players
Washington Warthogs players
Wichita Wings (NPSL) players
People from Fredericia
Association football forwards
Association football midfielders
Sportspeople from the Region of Southern Denmark